Azaxia is a genus of moths of the family Notodontidae.

Species
Azaxia dyari Schaus, 1911
Azaxia hamula Miller, 2011
Azaxia luteilinea (Druce, 1904)

References

Notodontidae
Moth genera